The UK Singles Chart is one of many music charts compiled by the Official Charts Company that calculates the best-selling singles of the week in the United Kingdom. Before 2004, the chart was only based on the sales of physical singles. This list shows singles that peaked in the Top 10 of the UK Singles Chart during 1973, as well as singles which peaked in 1972 and 1974 but were in the top 10 in 1973. The entry date is when the single appeared in the top 10 for the first time (week ending, as published by the Official Charts Company, which is six days after the chart is announced).

One-hundred and twenty-eight singles were in the top ten in 1973. Eight singles from 1972 remained in the top 10 for several weeks at the beginning of the year, while "The Show Must Go On" by Leo Sayer and "You Won't Find Another Fool Like Me" by The New Seekers featuring Lyn Paul were both released in 1973 but did not reach their peak until 1974. "Nights in White Satin" by The Moody Blues, "Shotgun Wedding" by Roy C and "Solid Gold Easy Action" by T. Rex were the singles from 1972 to reach their peak in 1973. Twenty-nine artists scored multiple entries in the top 10 in 1973. David Essex, Leo Sayer, Marie Osmond, Mud and Wizzard were among the many artists who achieved their first UK charting top 10 single in 1973.

The 1972 Christmas number-one, "Long Haired Lover from Liverpool" by Little Jimmy Osmond, remained at number-one for the first three weeks of 1973. The first new number-one single of the year was "Blockbuster" by The Sweet. Overall, seventeen different singles peaked at number-one in 1973, with Slade (3) having the most singles hit that position.

Background

Multiple entries
One-hundred and twenty-eight singles charted in the top 10 in 1973, with one-hundred and twenty-one singles reaching their peak this year.

Twenty-nine artists scored multiple entries in the top 10 in 1973. Donny Osmond secured the record for most top 10 hits in 1973 with six hit singles. He scored three top 10 entries in 1973 as a solo artist, with "The Twelfth of Never" and "Young Love" both reaching number-one, and "When I Fall in Love" peaking at number four in November. His sister Marie made her top 10 debut in November with the number two hit "Paper Roses". Donny's total was boosted to six by his participation on The Osmonds recordings. The family group scored two top 10 entries in 1973 with "Going Home", which peaked at number four in July and "Let Me In", which peaked at number two in November. Their number two hit from November 1972, "Crazy Horses", remained in the top 10 for the first three weeks of 1973.

David Bowie peaked in the top 10 with five singles in 1973. He reached number two in January with "The Jean Genie", while "Drive-In Saturday", "Life on Mars" and "Sorrow" all peaked at number three. His single "The Laughing Gnome", originally released in 1967, also entered the top 10, reaching number six in October. Slade made chart history by going straight in at number-one an unprecedented three times with "Cum On Feel The Noize", "Skweeze Me, Pleeze Me", and "Merry Xmas Everybody", the last of which became the Christmas number-one single that year. They also reached number two in October with their single "My Friend Stan". They had five entries in total this year but this included "Gudbuy T'Jane" from the latter part of 1972. Little Jimmy Osmond had two individual entries, including "Long Haired Lover from Liverpool" from 1972 and his number four single "Tweedle Dee" in April, as well as being a part of The Osmonds collective.

David Cassidy, Gary Glitter and Wizzard all scored four top 10 entries in 1973. The Partridge Family singer David Cassidy had two hit singles as part of the group - "Looking Through the Eyes of Love" at number nine and "Walking in the Rain" peaking at number ten - as well as the number-one hit "Daydreamer"/"The Puppy Song", and "I am a Clown"/"Some Kind of a Summer" which reached number three. Gary Glitter's first two entries, "Do You Wanna Touch Me (Oh Yeah)" and "Hello, Hello, I'm Back Again", both peaked at number two, while the remaining two, "I'm the Leader of the Gang (I Am)" and "I Love You Love Me Love", both spent four weeks at number-one. 
Wizzard were fronted by Roy Wood, an ex-member of The Move and Electric Light Orchestra. Their debut single "Ball Park Incident" peaked at number six in January, while "See My Baby Jive" and "Angel Fingers (A Teen Ballad)" both reached the top spot. They also reached number four in December with "I Wish It Could Be Christmas Everyday".

Solo artists Suzi Quatro, Barry Blue and David Essex all made their top 10 debut in 1973, and all three scored a second entry later in the year. Suzi Quatro made her top 10 debut in May with "Can the Can", which spent a week at number-one in June, while "48 Crash" peaked at number three in August. Barry Blue made his top 10 debut in August with "Dancing on a Saturday Night", which peaked at number two, while "Do You Wanna Dance" reached number seven in November. David Essex made his top 10 debut in September with "Rock On", which peaked at number three, while "Lamplight" reached number seven in December.

Sweet had three top-ten entries, among these chart-topper "Block Buster!". The other artists with three top 10 singles were 10cc, Elton John, Paul McCartney, T. Rex and Wings.

Gilbert O'Sullivan was one of a number of artists with two top-ten entries, including the number-one single "Get Down". Alice Cooper, The Carpenters, The Partridge Family, Rod Stewart, Roxy Music and Status Quo were among the other artists who had multiple top 10 entries in 1973.

Chart debuts
Thirty-four artists achieved their first top 10 single in 1973, either as a lead or featured artist. Of these, four went on to record another hit single that year: Barry Blue, David Essex, Nazareth and Suzi Quatro. Wizzard had three other entries in their breakthrough year.

The following table (collapsed on desktop site) does not include acts who had previously charted as part of a group and secured their first top 10 solo single.

Notes
Roger Daltrey of The Who scored his first and only solo hit single in the UK in 1973 with "Giving It All Away". With the band he had achieved eleven top 10 entries by that point (a re-release of The Who's 1966 hit "Substitute" would become the twelfth in 1976) including "Pinball Wizard" and "My Generation". Bryan Ferry came to prominence as lead singer of Roxy Music who peaked at number four in 1972 for the first time with "Virginia Plain". However 1973's "A Hard Rain's Gonna Fall" was a top 10 entry under in his own name. Manfred Mann previously appeared in the chart with his eponymous band. After this group and short-lived act Manfred Mann Chapter Three disbanded, he formed Manfred Mann's Earth Band.

Lyn Paul had been a member of The New Seekers since 1970 but "You Won't Find Another Fool Like Me" saw her sing lead vocals for the first time and she was given an individual credit for the recording. She would get the same treatment on the band's next top 10 single, "I Get a Little Sentimental Over You", the following year.

Songs from films
The only song from a film to enter the top 10 in 1973 was "Live and Let Die" (from Live and Let Die). Additionally, "When I Fall in Love" was originally recorded by Nat King Cole for the 1957 film Istanbul.

Best-selling singles
Tony Orlando and Dawn had the best-selling single of the year with "Tie a Yellow Ribbon Round the Ole Oak Tree". The single spent eleven weeks in the top 10 (including four weeks at number one) and was certified by the BPI. "Eye Level" by Simon Park Orchestra came in second place. Peters and Lee's "Welcome Home", "Block Buster!" from The Sweet and "Cum On Feel the Noize" by Slade made up the top five. Singles by Wizzard, Gary Glitter ("I'm the Leader of the Gang (I Am)" & "I Love You Love Me Love"), Donny Osmond and Al Martino were also in the top ten best-selling singles of the year.

Top-ten singles
Key

Entries by artist

The following table shows artists who achieved two or more top 10 entries in 1973, including singles that reached their peak in 1972. The figures include both main artists and featured artists, while appearances on ensemble charity records are also counted for each artist. The total number of weeks an artist spent in the top ten in 1973 is also shown.

See also
1973 in British music
List of number-one singles from the 1970s (UK)

Notes

 "Shotgun Wedding" re-entered the top 10 at number 8 on 6 January 1973 (week ending). It originally peaked at number 6 on its initial release in 1966.
 "Nights in White Satin" originally peaked outside the top 10 at number 19 on its initial release in 1968.
 "My Love" and "Live and Let Die" were both credited to Paul McCartney and Wings, while "Hi, Hi, Hi"/"C Moon" was credited to Wings.
"Power to All Our Friends" was the United Kingdom's entry at the Eurovision Song Contest in 1973.
 "My Love" re-entered the top 10 at number 9 on 12 May 1973 (week ending).
 "Albatross" originally peaked at number 1 on its initial release in 1968. In 1973, the song was re-released as part of a CBS Records series entitled "Hall of Fame Hits".
 "Ying Tong Song" originally peaked at number 3 on its initial release in 1956.
 "Dancin' (on a Saturday Night)" peaked at number 1 on the Melody Maker charts on 15 September 1973 (week ending).
 "Eye Level" was the theme tune to the television series Van der Valk.
 Figure includes single that peaked in 1972.
 Figures includes three top 10 hits with the group The Osmonds.
 Figures includes two top 10 hits with the group The Partridge Family.
 Figures includes three top 10 hits with the group Wings. 
 Figures includes single that first charted in 1972 but peaked in 1973.
 Figure includes a top 10 hit with the group Faces.
 Figure includes a top 10 hit with the group The Rolling Stones.

References
General

Specific

External links
1973 singles chart archive at the Official Charts Company (click on relevant week)

Top 10 singles
United Kingdom
1973